Rittana is a comune (municipality) in the Province of Cuneo in the Italian region Piedmont, located about  southwest of Turin and about  southwest of Cuneo.

Rittana borders the following municipalities: Bernezzo, Gaiola, Monterosso Grana, Roccasparvera, Valgrana, and Valloriate.

References

Cities and towns in Piedmont